Emergency Broadcast System is an album by psychedelic trance artists G.M.S. which was released in November, 2005.

Popular culture
The track "Baty Boy" features samples from the motion picture Batman Forever and also utilises the four main thematic notes of the Batman theme as the driving melody for the track.
The track "Juice" is based on the theme song to the motion picture Requiem for a Dream, the sound track for which was written by Clint Mansell.

Track listing
 "Rounders" – 8:06
 "Dance Of The Warthog" – 8:15
 "Higher" – 7:36
 "Baty Boy" – 7:21
 "No Way" – 8:29
 "Psychedelic Adventure" – 7:27
 "I Can Feel Da Music" – 8:15
 "The Ring" – 7:52
 "Fingers" – 7:21
 "Juice (Live Version)" – 7:09

2005 albums
GMS (music group) albums